Pear Island is a small island lying immediately southwest of False Island, off the northeast coast of Anvers Island in the Palmer Archipelago. The existence of the island is noted on a British hydrographic chart of 1929; the name is presumably descriptive of shape and appears on a British hydrographic chart of 1952.

References

See also 
 List of Antarctic and sub-Antarctic islands

Islands of the Palmer Archipelago